Janice Meredith, also known as The Beautiful Rebel, is a silent film starring Marion Davies, released in 1924 and based on the book and play of the same name written by Paul Leicester Ford and Edward Everett Rose. The play opened at the end of 1900 and was the first starring vehicle for stage actress Mary Mannering.  The movie follows the actions of Janice Meredith, who helps George Washington and Paul Revere during the American Revolutionary War.

Plot

Following a disappointment in love, Lord Brereton assumes the name of Charles Fownes, arranges passage to the American Colonies as a bondservant, and finds a place with Squire Meredith, a wealthy New Jersey landowner. When Charles falls in love with the squire's daughter, Janice, she is sent to live with an aunt in Boston. Janice learns of the planned British troop movement to the Lexington arsenal and gives the warning that results in Paul Revere's ride. Charles reveals his true station and becomes an aide to Washington. When he is captured by the British, Janice arranges his escape and later helps him learn the disposition of the British troops at Trenton. Janice returns to her home and agrees to marry Philemon Hennion, an aristocrat of her father's choosing. Charles and some Continental troops halt the wedding and confiscate the Meredith lands. Janice flees to Philadelphia, and Charles follows her. He is arrested but is freed when the British general, Howe, recognizes Charles as his old friend, Lord Brereton. Janice and her father retire with the British to Yorktown. During the bombardment by Washington's forces, Lord Clowes binds Janice and abducts her in his coach. Charles rescues her. With peace restored, Janice and Charles meet at Mount Vernon, where they are to be married in the presence of President Washington.

Cast
 Marion Davies as Janice Meredith
 Holbrook Blinn as Lord Clowes
 Harrison Ford as Charles Fownes
 Macklyn Arbuckle as Squire Meredith
 Joseph Kilgour as General George Washington
 Hattie Delaro as Mrs. Meredith
 George Nash as Lord Howe
 Tyrone Power, Sr. as Lord Cornwallis
 May Vokes as Susie
 W.C. Fields as A British Sergeant
 Olin Howland as Philemon
 Helen Lee Worthing as Mrs. Loring
 Spencer Charters as Squire Hennion
 Douglas Stevenson as Captain Mowbrary
 Lionel Adams as Thomas Jefferson
 Edwin Argus as Louis XVI
 Lee Beggs as Benjamin Franklin
 Nicolai Koesberg as Lafayette
 Ken Maynard as Paul Revere
 Burton McEvilly as Alexander Hamilton
 Harlan Knight as Theodore Larkin
 Walter Law as General Charles Lee
 Wilfred Noy as Dr. Joseph Warren
 Florence Turner as Maid

Production
In her 19th film, Marion Davies starred as Janice Meredith in a story about the American Revolution. As with Yolanda, this film was not considered to be a hit, but the trade papers reported a record-breaking run at the Cosmopolitan Theater in New York. Exteriors were shot in New York with extended location shooting in Upstate New York. Hearst built a replica of Trenton, NJ, in Plattsburgh, and the Saranac River doubled for the Delaware. Other scenes were filmed on Lake Placid. Screenland noted that Hearst spent $80,000 on the recreation of the Battle of Lexington. The film received generally good reviews. The large cast included W.C. Fields in his feature film debut. Davies and Fields had worked together in the 1916 edition of the "Ziegfeld Follies."

Survival status
The existing print is actually the British version, which was titled The Beautiful Rebel.

References

External links

 
AFI information on the film

1924 films
1924 drama films
American black-and-white films
American Revolutionary War films
American romantic drama films
American silent feature films
Films based on adaptations
Films based on American novels
American films based on plays
Films directed by E. Mason Hopper
Metro-Goldwyn-Mayer films
Cultural depictions of George Washington
Cultural depictions of Thomas Jefferson
Cultural depictions of Louis XVI
Cultural depictions of Benjamin Franklin
Cultural depictions of Gilbert du Motier, Marquis de Lafayette
Cultural depictions of Paul Revere
Cultural depictions of Alexander Hamilton
1920s American films
Silent romantic drama films
Silent American drama films